The Richmond and Danville Railroad (R&D) Company was a railroad that operated independently from 1847 until 1894, first in the U.S. state of Virginia, and later on  of track in nine states.

Chartered on March 9, 1847, the railroad completed its  line between Richmond and Danville in 1856. During the American Civil War, the railroad was a vital link between the Confederate capital of Richmond and the rest of the Confederacy. After the Civil War, the railroad grew to become the  Richmond and Danville Railroad Company System.

Placed in receivership in 1892, the Richmond and Danville Railroad Company was sold in 1894 and conveyed into the new Southern Railway Company (later the Norfolk Southern Railway) in 1896 and 1897.

History

Beginnings (1847-61)
The new Richmond and Danville Railroad was championed by Whitmell P. Tunstall, a lawyer in Chatham, Virginia, who was also a member of the Virginia General Assembly. After many years, Tunstall secured a charter for the new railroad on March 9, 1847. In the same year, the state of Virginia took a 60% interest in the capital stock of the company, which it would hold until 1871.

Construction on the  line began on January 31, 1848 under the supervision of Col. Andrew Talcott, who was later to become the Richmond and Danville's general manager. By 1850, the new railroad had reached Coalfield Station, near the coal mines in an area known today as Midlothian in western Chesterfield County. There, it competed with the mule-powered Chesterfield Railroad, the first railroad established in Virginia. Lawsuits followed, but the older railroad was quickly supplanted by the competition.  The Virginia General Assembly allowed the Richmond and Danville Railroad to buy the Chesterfield Railroad for as much as $200,000 in 1848.

By the end of 1851, the line had reached Jetersville in Amelia County. Two years later, it was completed to a point near Drakes Branch, and had been graded to South Boston in Halifax County. On May 16, 1856, the railroad had finished construction of the main line.

Its stations included:

 Richmond
 Midlothian Coal Pits 
 Amelia Court House
 Jetersville 
 Jennings Ordinary
 Burkeville 
 Meherrin
 Keysville
 Mossingford, now Mossingford Road Virginia State Route 642, in Charlotte County. 
 Clover
 South Boston
 New's Ferry in Halifax County
 Barksdale in Halifax County
 Ringgold
 Dan River
 Danville

Civil War (1861–1865)

Known as the "first railroad war," the American Civil War devastated the South's railroads and economy. In 1862, the Richmond and York River Railroad — acquired after the war by the R&D — played a crucial role in George McClellan's Peninsula Campaign.  

In 1862, the R&D employed 400 laborers, 50 train hands, 30 carpenters, and 20 blacksmiths. The railroad also employed 300 slaves, some of which it owned and some whose labor it rented from local planters. If a rented slave was injured or killed, the railroad reimbursed his or her owner; in one instance, the R&D paid $1,379.44 for a slave killed in an accident. Some enslaved women were put to work as maids in ladies' dining cars.  
  
The Richmond and Danville Railroad was an essential transportation link for the Confederacy throughout the war. It provided the production of south-central Virginia to Richmond. When the Richmond and Petersburg Railroad was cut in 1864, the R&D's connection with the Piedmont Railroad was the only remaining connection from Richmond to the rest of the South.

The Confederate Army was often handicapped by its inability to transport supplies efficiently from depots to forces in the field. In one case, the war forced the  Confederate government to over-rule objections by North Carolina. That state had blocked construction of a rail connection from Greensboro to Danville, fearing that post-war trade from North Carolina's Piedmont would continue to flow to Richmond via the R&D.

April 1865 
Following successful Union attacks on April 1, 1865, Confederate Gen. Robert E. Lee abandoned Petersburg and headed west and south in an attempt to join Gen. Joseph Johnston's army in North Carolina.

After evacuating Richmond the next day, on April 2, 1865, Confederate President Jefferson Davis and his cabinet left Richmond on the R&D. The departing Confederates set fire to the bridge across the James River between Richmond and Manchester. They traveled to Danville, where they attempted to set up a temporary government.

On reaching Amelia Courthouse during the morning of April 4, 1865, Lee searched the commissary stores, finding abundant ordnance but no food. Lee waited 24 hours in vain there for R&D trains to arrive with badly needed supplies. Union cavalry, meanwhile, sped forward and cut the Richmond & Danville at Jetersville. Lee had to abandon the railroad, and his army stumbled across rolling country towards Lynchburg. On the morning of April 9, 1865, Palm Sunday, Lee met Grant in the front parlor of Wilmer McLean's home near Appomattox Court House to surrender.

Reconstruction (1865–94)

With the support of Virginia Governor Francis H. Pierpont, Algernon S. Buford became president of the  R&D on September 13, 1865. Repair work began on war-damaged tracks, including the bridge across the James River between Manchester and Richmond.

Over the next 20 years, Buford, Richmonder James H. Dooley, and other leaders extended the railroad's trackage to 3,000 miles through construction and acquisition. Early acquisitions included the Piedmont Railroad in 1866 and a 25-year lease of the North Carolina Railroad in 1871.

In 1871, the Southern Railway Security Company acquired the 60 percent stake in the railroad held by the state of Virginia. Another large shareholder was the Pennsylvania Railroad Company.

In 1877, Buford joined with Andrew Talcott, Thomas Mann Talcott, and others to form the Bon Air Land and Improvement Company, a land investment that added a resort train stop in Bon Air six miles east of Richmond.

In 1880, control of the R&D was acquired by William P. Clyde and interests that controlled the Richmond, York River and Chesapeake Rail Road Company.

In 1881, the Richmond and West Point Terminal Railway and Warehouse Company was organized to develop and expand the R&D, whose charter limited its control of connecting railroads.

In 1882, the R&D, along with the North Carolina Railroad, Northwestern North Carolina Railroad, Charlotte, Columbia and Augusta Railroad, Atlanta and Charlotte Air-Line Railway and the Columbia and Greenville Railroad lines were being operated as the Piedmont Air-Line System advertised as the shortest line between New York, New Orleans and Texas.  One improvement that year was the installation of two steam powered Nutter car hoists in north Danville, Virginia in order to allow truck exchange to allow cars to be exchanged across the break of gauge with the Virginia Midland Railway.

In or about 1886, the Richmond and West Point Terminal Railway and Warehouse Company acquired a majority of  R&D Company stock, and thus control of the railroad.

By 1890, the R&D System covered  of track in Virginia, North Carolina, South Carolina, Georgia, Tennessee, Alabama, Mississippi, Arkansas, and Texas. However, the R&D System had become financially unstable during all the growth. After the Richmond and West Point Terminal Railway and Warehouse Company, declared bankruptcy, the R&D Company was pulled down with it. Receivers were appointed to take possession of its property, including its subsidiaries, on June 15, 1892.

Southern Railway System (1894-1982)
On June 18, 1894, the R&D was sold in foreclosure. Its property was surrendered to Southern Railway Company for operation on July 1, 1894, even though the deeds of conveyance were not completed and filed until later. Reorganized by J.P. Morgan and his New York banking firm of Drexel, Morgan and Company, the R&D was merged with five other railroads to form the new Southern Railway.

The R&D property was formally conveyed to Southern Railway Company by deeds dated January 9, 1896, and August 30, 1897. Samuel Spencer became Southern's first president.

Norfolk Southern (1982-present)
Norfolk Southern Corporation, a holding corporation, acquired control of Norfolk and Western Railway Company and Southern Railway Company and their affiliates and subsidiaries on June 1, 1982, after approval by the Interstate Commerce Commission. Effective December 31, 1990, Southern Railway Company changed its name to Norfolk Southern Railway Company.  Norfolk and Western Railway Company became a wholly owned subsidiary of Norfolk Southern Railway Company rather than a subsidiary of Norfolk Southern Corporation. In 1999, the system grew substantially with the acquisition of over half of Consolidated Rail Corporation (Conrail).

Officers

Presidents
 Whitmell P. Tunstall (1847 – February 19, 1854)
 A. F. D. (Adolphus Frederick Danberry) Gifford (February 19, 1854 – April 13, 1854) (acting president)
 Vincent Witcher (April 13, 1854 – December 10, 1856)
 Lewis E. Harvie (December 10, 1856 – September 12, 1865)
 Algernon Sidney Buford (September 13, 1865 – December 16, 1886)
 George S. Scott (1884, December 21, 1887 – December 18, 1889)
 Alfred Sully (December 16, 1886 – December 21, 1887)
 John H. Inman (December 18, 1889 – March 16, 1892)
 Walter G.(George) Oakman (March 16, 1892 – 1894)

Vice presidents
 A. F. D. Gifford
 A. Y. Stokes (1868 or before – 1880/1)
 Joseph N.(Napoleon) DuBarry (Btw. 1876 and 1878 – 1880/1)
 Thomas M. Logan (1881/2 – 1883), 1st VP
 T. M. R.(Thomas Mann Randolph) Talcott (1881/2 – 1883, 1888/9 – 1889), 2nd VP 1881/2–1883, 1st VP 1888/9–1889
 Joseph Bryan (1881/2 – 1884), 3rd VP
 Calvin S. Brice (1884), 1st VP
 Alfred L. Rives (1883 – 1885/6), 2nd VP
 Frederick W. Huidekoper (1885 – 1885/6), 1st VP
 Walter G.(George) Oakman (Fall 1883 – 1887, 1887 – May 1, 1891), 3rd VP Fall 1883–1887, 2nd VP 1887–1888, 1st VP 1888–May 1, 1891, Pres. 1892–1894
 Alexander B.(Boyd) Andrews (1886/7 – 1894), 3rd VP 1886/7–1889, 2nd VP 1890–1894
 Henry Fink (Apr. 30, 1887 – Dec. 16, 1887)
 J. W. Johnston (1890), 3rd VP
 Peyton Randolph (1891), 3rd VP
 John A. Rutherford (1892 – 1894), 3rd VP

Acquired railroads
 Piedmont Railroad: A 48.5-mile line from Danville, Virginia, to Greensboro, North Carolina. Chartered in March 1862. Construction began 1862 and ended late 1863. The R&D bought most shares and built and operated the railroad. Leased to R&D for 86 years on Feb. 20, 1874. Bought by the Southern Railway in 1894.
 North Carolina Railroad – A 223.15-mile line from Goldsboro to Charlotte, North Carolina, leased for 30 years (starting Oct. 1871) on September 11, 1871, for an annual rent of $260,000. The North Carolina Railroad Company was chartered on January 27, 1849, and the line opened January 30, 1856. The R&D made an offer to lease the NC RR in January 1871 but was rejected. In September 1871, a new offer was made and accepted. In 1895, R&D successor Southern Railway negotiated a 99-year lease for the NC RR.
 North-Western North Carolina Railroad: A 103.22-mile line from Greensboro to Wilkesboro, North Carolina. The NWNC RR was chartered in 1868 and acquired by the R&D in early 1871. The line was finished in 1873. Purchased by the Southern Railway along with the rest of the R&D system in 1894.
 Richmond, York River and Chesapeake Railroad
 Milton and Sutherlin Railroad
 State University Railroad
 Atlanta and Charlotte Air Line Railway
 Charlotte, Columbia and Augusta Railroad
 Atlantic, Tennessee and Ohio Railroad
 Danville, Mocksville, and Southwestern Railroad
 Chester and Lenoir Narrow Gauge Railroad
 Asheville and Spartanburg Railroad
 Western North Carolina Railroad
 Statesville and Western Railroad
 Oxford and Henderson Railroad
 Oxford and Clarksville Railroad
 Danville and Western Railroad
 High Point, Randleman, Asheboro and Southern Railroad
 North Carolina Midland Railroad
 Atlantic and Danville Railway
 Yadkin Valley Railroad

Maps
  in 
  at  D. H.Ramsey Library, Special Collections, University of North Carolina at Asheville 28804

See also 

 Confederate railroads in the American Civil War
 The song The Night They Drove Old Dixie Down, by North American rock group The Band, is a fictional narrative by a Confederate soldier who "served on the Danville Train" during the Civil War, and describes the tracks being torn up by General Stoneman's cavalry.
 Railway accident on the Bostian Bridge, a bridge on which a trespasser was fatally hit by a train on the 119th anniversary of a previous accident.

Notes

References 
  at Google Books
 
 
 
 
 Interstate Commerce Commission. Southern Ry. Co., Volume 37, Interstate Commerce Commission Valuation Reports, November 6, 1931. Washington: United States Government Printing Office, 1932. .
 Confederate Railroads website                  
 Dan River Tour website
 Civil War Richmond
 College of William and Mary, Railroads in Antebellum Richmond
 Scott Reynolds Nelson (1999) Iron Confederacies: Southern Railways, Klan Violence, and Reconstruction 
 Virginia Places, Sectional Rivalry page
 Lee's Retreat - A Driving Tour
 An Abbreviated History of Pittsylvania County, Virginia - Transportation and Routes
 US Civil War, Appomattox Campaign
 The Stranger's Guide and Official Directory for the City of Richmond Electronic Edition
 Iron Confederacies Timeline

External links

Defunct Virginia railroads
Defunct North Carolina railroads
Defunct South Carolina railroads
Defunct Georgia (U.S. state) railroads
Defunct Alabama railroads
Defunct Mississippi railroads
Railway lines in Atlanta
Predecessors of the Southern Railway (U.S.)
History of Richmond, Virginia
Railway companies established in 1847
Railway companies disestablished in 1894
Defunct Washington, D.C., railroads
5 ft gauge railways in the United States
1847 establishments in Virginia